Arabianus was an eminent Christian writer who lived around 196. He composed some books on Christian doctrine, which are lost. Nothing more is known of him, and the writers who mention him, like Eusebius, do not even tell us the title of the work Arabianus wrote.

References

2nd-century historians
2nd-century Christian theologians